Al Awabi is one of the 62 provinces (wilayat) of Oman. It is located in Al Batinah Region, north of Oman. Based on the figures of the 2020 census, Al Awabi is home for 18,833 people, compared to 10,469 in 2003. It has 32 villages.

Location 
Al Awabi is approximately 156 km from the capital city, Muscat, 16 km from Rustaq, and 36 km from Nakhal.

Information 
Al Awabi is a quiet town surrounded by a chain of high mountains. Extraordinary rock formations can be seen in Wadi Bani Kharus gorge in the Al Hajar Mountains. Wadi Bani Kharus is a 26-km long wadi that goes deep in the mountains and finally ends at Jebel Akhdar, the highest summit in Oman. Wadi Bani Kharus is famous for its rich heritage, and history. Its villages, surrounded by mountains, are well known for their picturesque character.

Al Awabi has a number of tourist destinations, such as Al Elya village, which is the final station in Wadi Bani Kharus, which itself is a noted tourist destination. Also, the Castle of Awabi, which was built almost 200 years ago and restored again in 2008, and Subaikha village which is classified as a natural reserve, and it is around 20 km away from Al Awabi town centre.

A number of agricultural products are grown in Al Awabi other than dates (palm trees), such as mango, orange, lime, pomegranates, banana, Guava, and figs as well as common vegetables.

As of 2006, Al Awabi had 8 schools and a hospital (with 18 beds) and a health center.

Population

References

Provinces of Oman